Katie Reid (born 1995) is a British sprint canoeist.  She qualified to compete at the 2020 Summer Olympics in the women's K-1 200 metres race.

Reid was born in Kirkcaldy, Scotland and was a Scottish karate champion before joining the Girls4Gold scheme to train as a sprint canoeist.

On 8 July 2021 Reid was selected for the British canoe sprint squad for the 2020 Olympics in Tokyo.

References

1995 births
Living people
British female canoeists
Olympic canoeists of Great Britain
Canoeists at the 2020 Summer Olympics